Cottonwood Creek originates in the Ancient Bristlecone Pine Forests of the White Mountains of eastern California. The creek flows eastward from below the alpine crest of the White Mountains and descends through groves of bristlecone pine, aspen and mountain mahogany, then a woodland of pinyon pine and juniper, and finally into sagebrush as the stream ends in endorheic Fish Lake Valley which is one of the contiguous collection of inward-draining basins that make up the Great Basin.

Cottonwood Creek has no native fish, however its North Fork is a refuge for the threatened Paiute cutthroat trout, one of the rarest trout in North America.  This subspecies was transplanted from its very limited native range, upper Silver King Creek in the Carson River basin.  The remainder of the stream hosts (originally) transplanted brook, brown and rainbow trout.  Habitat around the creek also supports more than 70 species of birds.

Cottonwood Creek originates in ancient bristlecone forests and is the longest perennial stream east of the White Mountains. The creek flows eastward from the 14,000-foot crest of the White Mountains and steeply descends through groves of aspen, eventually flowing into a sagebrush desert. Numerous springs feed the creek as it meanders through large meadows in the upper reaches. Stands of aspen and bristlecone pine can be found in the higher elevations, while lower elevations are marked with stands of pinyon and juniper trees.

Cottonwood Creek is home to the Paiute cutthroat trout, one of the rarest trout in North America. A riparian willow and cottonwood habitat supports protected bird species such as the Yellow Warbler, Yellow-Breasted Chat, Prairie Falcon, and Cooper's Hawk. Cottonwood Creek offers a variety of recreation opportunities.

References
2. The Bureau of Land Management manages this river.

Rivers of Inyo County, California
Rivers of the Great Basin
Inyo National Forest
White Mountains (California)
Wild and Scenic Rivers of the United States
Rivers of Northern California